The Louis D. Brandeis Privacy Award is named in honor of US Supreme Court Justice Louis Brandeis and awarded by Patient Privacy Rights, the top US health privacy watchdog, representing the public's rights and interests in restoring control over the use of medical records/health data. It recognizes "significant intellectual, cultural, legal, scholarly, and technical contributions to the field of health information privacy." (In his 1928 dissent to Olmstead v. United States, Brandeis famously defined privacy as "the right to be left alone.")

Recipients include the following.
2012: Representative Joe Barton. Representative Ed Markey, Ross J. Anderson, Alan Westin
2013: Peter Hustinx, Mark Rothstein
2014: Latanya Sweeney, Peter Schaar
2015: Alex Pentland, Masao Horibe
2016: Joe Cannataci
2017: Nikolaus Forgo

Privacy International, a UK privacy activist organization, also has its own Louis Brandeis Award for privacy.

See also 
 List of humanitarian and service awards  
 The Celebration of Privacy Gala

References

Humanitarian and service awards
Awards established in 2012